Roxana Benavídez Mejía (born 1 September 1987) is a Bolivian footballer who has played as a midfielder for the Bolivia women's national team.

International career
Benavídez played for Bolivia at senior level in two Copa América Femenina editions (2006 and 2010).

International goals
Scores and results list Bolivia's goal tally first

References

1987 births
Living people
Women's association football midfielders
Bolivian women's footballers
Sportspeople from La Paz
Bolivia women's international footballers
Club Aurora players